= Attiwad =

- Village
- Location in Karnataka, India Attiwad (India)
- Coordinates: 15.944°N 74.432°E
- Country: India
- State: Karnataka
- District: Belgaum
- Talukas: Belgaum

Area
  - Total: 797.9 ha (1,972 acres)
- Elevation: 752 m (2,467 ft)

Population (2011)
  - Total: 1,643
  - Density: 205.9/km^{2} (533.3/sq mi)

Languages
  - Official: Kannada
- Time zone: UTC+5:30 (IST)
- Postal code: 591128
- Sex ratio: 958 ♂/♀

Attiwad is a village in Belagavi district in the southern state of Karnataka, India.
